At the 1960 Winter Olympics, eight Nordic skiing events were contested – six cross-country skiing events, one ski jumping event, and one Nordic combined event.

1960 Winter Olympics events
1960